The 1992–93 South Pacific cyclone season was an above-average tropical cyclone season with ten tropical cyclones occurring within the South Pacific to the east of 160°E. The season officially ran from November 1, 1992, to April 30, 1993, with the first disturbance of the season forming on December 3 and the last disturbance dissipating on April 6. 

During the season, tropical cyclones were monitored by the Tropical Cyclone Warning Centers (TCWC) in Nadi, Fiji, and in Wellington, New Zealand. Whilst tropical cyclones that moved to the west of 160°E were monitored as a part of the Australian region by the Australian Bureau of Meteorology. Both the United States Joint Typhoon Warning Center (JTWC) and the Naval Western Oceanography Center (NWOC) issued unofficial warnings within the southern Pacific. The JTWC issued warnings between 160°E and the International Date Line whilst the NWOC issued warnings for tropical cyclones forming between the International Date Line and the coasts of the Americas. Both the JTWC and the NWOC designated tropical cyclones with a number and a P suffix with numbers assigned in order to tropical cyclones developing within the whole of the Southern Hemisphere. TCWC Nadi and TCWC Wellington both use the Australian Tropical Cyclone Intensity Scale, and measure windspeeds over a period of ten minutes, while the JTWC and the NWOC measured sustained winds over a period of one minute and use the Saffir–Simpson Hurricane Scale.

Seasonal summary 

On July 1, 1992, the New Zealand Meteorological Service (TCWC Wellington) was broken up and became the Meteorological Service of New Zealand and the National Institute of Water and Atmospheric Research.

Ahead of the 1992–93 season it was predicted that the season would feature a below average amount of tropical cyclones, after six tropical cyclones had affected Vanuatu during the previous season. During that season as no systems had affected the archipelago, the VMS had started to hope that no tropical cyclones would impact the archipelago during the season. However, during March 29 – 30, Cyclone Prema affected the Shepherd, E'pi and Efate where it caused widespread damage to buildings and crops.

Systems

Severe Tropical Cyclone Joni 

At the start of December a shallow tropical depression developed, along the South Pacific Convergence Zone, in the vicinity of Tuvalu. Over the next few days the system gradually developed further as it affected Tuvalu, before it was declared to be a tropical cyclone and named Joni by the Fiji Meteorological Service (FMS) during December 7. Over the next couple of days the system intensified further as it was steered south-westwards and posed a threat to the Fijian dependency of Rotuma and the French territory of Wallis and Futuna. The system subsequently peaked as a Category 4 severe tropical cyclone on the Australian tropical cyclone intensity scale as it approached the Fijian Islands during December 10. Over the next couple of days the system moved through the Fijian Islands before it became an extratropical cyclone during December 13. The system was last noted during the next day as it was absorbed by a mid-latitude trough of low pressure to the east of New Zealand.

Joni caused gale to storm-force winds on the Tuvaluan island of Niulakita and minor damage to most of the Tuvaluan islands. The main impacts of Joni in Fiji were confined to the Western Division, with the islands of Yasawa, Mamanuca, Viti Levu, Kadavu and Vatulele being the worst affected areas. Damages in both Tuvalu and Fiji were exacerbated a month later by Severe Tropical Cyclones Nina and Kina interacting with each other.

Severe Tropical Cyclone Kina 

Over the next few days the depression gradually developed further as it moved slowly towards the south-southeast, before during December 26, the JTWC designated the system as Tropical Cyclone 07P and started to issue warnings on the system as it had become equivalent to a tropical storm. During the next day, the system appeared to slightly relax before it resumed developing from about 1200 UTC with the FMS naming it as Kina later that day, after the depression developed into a category one tropical cyclone. Early on December 28, the JTWC reported that the system had become equivalent to a category 1 hurricane on the SSHWS. During that day Kina continued to develop as it moved south-eastwards, before it turned towards the south and became slow moving later that day, before the JTWC reported during the next day that Kina had reached its peak intensity with 1-minute sustained wind speeds of 220 km/h (140 mph) which made it a category 4 hurricane on the SSHWS. Later that day TCWC Nadi reported that Kina had peaked as a category 3 severe tropical cyclone with 10 – minute sustained wind speeds of 150 km/h (90 mph).

Tracked towards the capital, Suva, where it caused significant damage and reports of casualties. The main bridge and secondary bridge to the international airport at Nadi collapsed and subsequently delayed the evacuation of tourists from the island, with emergency ferry services forced to ferry passengers from buses waiting on either side of the river bank.

Throughout Fiji, 23 people were killed and damage amounted to $100 million.

Severe Tropical Cyclone Nina 

During January 1, Nina crossed Rennell and Bellona in the Solomon Islands and moved into the South Pacific basin. intensity with

Severe Tropical Cyclone Lin 

Tropical Cyclone Mick 

Over the next few days the system gradually developed further, as it moved south-westwards and passed near the Tongan island of Keppel during February 5. The system subsequently passed through the islands of central Tonga and was named Mick by the FMS during February 6, after it had developed into a Category 1 tropical cyclone.

After being named the system continued to intensify during that day, before both the NPMOC and the FMS reported that Mick had peaked with winds of 85 km/h (50 mph). As Mick continued to move south-westwards further development was suppressed, by cooler waters and vertical wind shear as it accelerated through Fiji's Lau Islands. The system subsequently weakened gradually, before it rapidly lost its tropical characteristics, as it moved into the subtropics during February 9. As Mick was a small and weak system, it only caused a minimal amount of damage on the islands in Tonga and Fiji that it passed near or over.

Tropical Cyclone Nisha 

During February 9, a depression developed within the South Pacific Convergence Zone, just to the southwest of Pukapuka in the Northern Cook Islands. Over the next couple of days, the system remained near stationary, before it started to move south-eastwards towards Palmerston in the Southern Cook Islands during February 12. During that day, as the system moved south-eastwards the system developed a more symmetrical circulation, before the NPMOC initiated advisories on the system and designated it as Tropical Cyclone 18P. During the next day, the FMS reported that the depression had developed into a Category 1 tropical cyclone and named it Nisha, before it passed near Palmerston, as it started to curve towards the east-southeast.

Nisha did not cause any significant impacts in either the Southern Cook Islands or French Polynesia's

Tropical Cyclone Oli 

Oli existed from February 14 to February 20.

Severe Tropical Cyclone Polly 

Developed in the Australian region of the Coral sea far offshore from Queensland. The cyclone intensified to a Category 3 severe tropical cyclone (Australian intensity scale) before crossing into the South Pacific region where it passed to the southwest of New Caledonia.

Tropical Cyclone Roger 

Roger entered the basin on March 20 and dissipated on March 22.

Severe Tropical Cyclone Prema 

Prema existed from March 24 to April 6.

Other systems 
During that day the depression moved eastwards, before the NPMOC initiated advisories on the system and designated it as Tropical Cyclone 08P. During that day 08P started to move towards the southeast through the Cook Islands, before it peaked with estimated 1-minute sustained wind speeds of 85 km/h (50 mph). During January 3, 08P rapidly degenerated into an extratropical low, while it was located about 405 km to the southeast of Papeete in French Polynesia. There were no reports of any impacts within the Cook Islands associated with 08P. Over the next couple of days the system moved westwards and gradually turned and started to move south-eastwards before it was last noted during January 14.

Season effects 
This table lists all the storms that developed in the South Pacific to the east of longitude 160°E during the 1992–93 season. It includes their intensity on the Australian Tropical cyclone intensity scale, duration, name, landfalls, deaths, and damages. All data is taken from the warning centers from the region unless otherwise noted.

See also 

 Atlantic hurricane seasons: 1992, 1993
 Pacific hurricane seasons: 1992, 1993
 Pacific typhoon seasons: 1992, 1993
 North Indian Ocean cyclone seasons: 1992, 1993

Notes

References

External links 

 
South Pacific cyclone seasons
Articles which contain graphical timelines